Cormac Ó Curnín (died 1475) was an Irish poet.

Ó Curnín was a member of a brehon literary family of Breifne.

The Annals of the Four Masters record his death, sub anno 1475:

 Cormac O'Cuirnin, Preceptor of the learned of Ireland ... died.

See also

 Ruaidrí Ó Curnín, died 1496
 Conor Carragh Ó Curnín, died 1498
 Ferceirtne Ó Curnín, died 1519
 Domhnall Glas Ó Curnín, died 1519

References
 http://www.ucc.ie/celt/published/T100005D/
 http://www.irishtimes.com/ancestor/surname/index.cfm?fuseaction=Go.&UserID=

Medieval Irish poets
People from County Leitrim
15th-century Irish poets
1475 deaths
Year of birth unknown
Irish male poets